Beigang, Hokkō or Peikang is an urban township in Yunlin County, Taiwan. It is primarily known for its Chaotian Temple, one of the most prominent Temples of Mazu on Taiwan. It has a population of 37,763 as of February 2023.

Geography

The Beigang River borders the town on the east and south.

History

Dutch Formosa
During the Dutch era, Ponkan was an important coastal castle. In 1621, Pedro Yan Shiqi (顏思齊) from Zhangzhou, Fujian and his forces occupied Ponkan (modern-day Beigang) and started to develop Tsulosan (諸羅山; today's Chiayi City), which grew to become the capital of Tsulo County in 1704.

Administrative divisions
The township comprises 28 villages: Caohu, Dabei, Datong, Fupan, Fuzhao, Gongguan, Gongrong, Gouzao, Guangfu, Guangmin, Haoshou, Hougou, Huasheng, Liucuo, Nanan, Pangou, Renan, Renhe, Shuipu, Shujiao, Sifu, Tunghua, Tungyang, Xincuo, Xinjie, Xishi, Yimin and Zhonghe.

Education
The China Medical University has a branch in Beigang.

Beigang is only a short drive (approximately fifteen minutes by car) from National Chung Cheng University, one of Taiwan's foremost research universities.

National Beigang Senior High School

Tourist attractions

 Beigang Sports Park, Beigang Sports Park has a history of 50 years, and was previously a venue for track & field athletics, which has been greatly renovated with the times.  After renovation, a white sand pit was added, which became a place for children to play.

 Zhongshan Road, It is the old street surrounding Beigang Chaotian Temple, surrounded by many well-known specialty shops and snack bars. It is one of the highlights of Beigang.

 Nui Hui Morning Market, It used to be a place where cows were regularly sold in the morning. Nui Hui Morning Market has a history of more than 100 years and has now become a large vegetable market.

 Beigang Cultural Center
 Beigang Tourist Bridge, connecting the counties of Yunlin and Chiayi, which are separated by the Beigang River
 Beigang Chaotian Temple, one of the most important Mazu temples in Taiwan and known for its magnificent temple architecture, visited by more than a million pilgrims every year.
 Beigang Wude Temple, one of the largest temple dedicated to Xuan Tan Zhen Jun (玄壇真君), Martial God of Wealth.
 Museum of Beigang Story
 Beigang Water Tower

Local cuisine specialities
 Beigang Wedding Cakes (traditional wedding cakes) are a must-buy souvenir in Beigang. There are many flavors, both salty and sweet. Many married couples will come to buy wedding cakes, and ordinary tourists will take them home as snacks.
 Beigang Peanuts and Broad Beans

Cultural activities
 Festivities around the birthday of Mazu (23rd day of the third month of the lunar year)
 Baishatun Mazu Pilgrimage
 Beigang International Music Festival

Transportation

Bus stations in the county is Beigang Bus Station of Chiayi Bus.

Notable natives
 Alex Tsai, member of Legislative Yuan (2002-2016)
 Su Chih-fen, Magistrate of Yunlin County (2005-2014)
 Wu Se-hwa, Minister of Education (2014-2016)

References

External links

 Yunlin County, Beigang Township Office 
  Introduction of Beigang in the China Post
 National Geographic Traveler Taiwan, 

Townships in Yunlin County